KKZQ  (100.1 FM, "100.1 The Quake") is a commercial radio station that is licensed to Tehachapi, California, United States and serves the Antelope Valley area. The station is owned by High Desert Broadcasting and broadcasts a classic rock format. KKZQ leases space on KSRY's transmission tower.

History
KKZQ signed on in 2001 with a rhythmic oldies format branded "Mojo 100.1 FM". In 2002, the station flipped to soft adult contemporary as "The Breeze 100.1", formatted very similarly to KOST (103.5 FM), a Los Angeles-based station that could be received in the Antelope Valley. In 2003, KKZQ flipped to modern rock with the branding "The Edge 100.1". That format succeeded because there were no other modern rock-formatted stations audible in the Antelope Valley.

In August 2007, former WLUP-FM (Chicago) on-air personality Mark Zander joined KKZQ as programming director, adding to his existing duties in the same role with sister station KLKZ. Zander resigned from High Desert Broadcasting on June 13, 2008 to manage his own radio content production company.

On March 9, 2015, High Desert Broadcasting merged the active rock programming of KKZQ with the classic rock format of KQAV into a new mainstream rock station, branded "100.1 The Quake". KQAV simulcast KKZQ for five days, then stunted that weekend with a looped message directing listeners to the latter station at 100.1 FM; on March 16, the 93.5 FM frequency flipped to rhythmic oldies. KQAV morning show host Gary Crewes moved to middays on the new KKZQ, while The Edge's Mitchell retained his morning drive timeslot. In October 2017, KKZQ adjusted its format to classic rock, dropping the newer music that it was playing but keeping the Quake branding.

References

External links

Classic rock radio stations in the United States
KZQ
Radio stations established in 2001
2001 establishments in California